Liang Yuhao (born 3 March 1993 in Shaoguan) is a former Chinese-born Hong Kong professional football player who played as a goalkeeper.

Club career
In 2011, Liang came from Guangdong to Hong Kong, had training with Hong Kong First Division League club Tai Po, but he couldn't get into the first team during that season.

In 2012, Liang signed for Hong Kong Second Division League club Wanchai.

In 2012, Liang was loaning to Hong Kong First Division League club South China.

In 2013, Liang returned to Hong Kong Second Division League club Tai Po, and helped them to promoted to Hong Kong Premier League in 2014.

In 2015, Liang signed for Hong Kong Premier League club Eastern.

On 7 May 2016, Liang made his HKPL debut for Eastern against Kitchee, which the match lost 0–2.

In 2019, Liang played 2 consecutive matches for Eastern as the first-choice goalkeeper and he managed to keep a clean sheet against Dreams FC in Sapling Cup.

In July 2019, Liang was released by Eastern.

International career
After 4 years staying in Hong Kong, Liang became a local player, he could represent Hong Kong national football team.

On 27 March 2015, in 2016 AFC U-23 Championship qualification Group F, Liang made his debut for Hong Kong U-23 in a match against Australia U-23, which Hong Kong lost 0–6.

Honours

Club
Eastern
Hong Kong Premier League: 2015–16
Hong Kong Senior Shield: 2015–16

References

External links
 Liang Yuhao at HKFA

1993 births
Living people
Chinese footballers
Hong Kong footballers
Chinese expatriate footballers
Expatriate footballers in Hong Kong
Chinese expatriate sportspeople in Hong Kong
Footballers from Shaoguan
People from Shaoguan
Hong Kong First Division League players
Hong Kong Premier League players
Tai Po FC players
South China AA players
Eastern Sports Club footballers
Association football goalkeepers